There were two gubernatorial elections held in New Hampshire in 1878:

March 1878 New Hampshire gubernatorial election
November 1878 New Hampshire gubernatorial election